Meilhan is the name or part of the name of the following communes in France:

 Meilhan, Gers, in the Gers department
 Meilhan, Landes, in the Landes department
 Meilhan-sur-Garonne, called Meilhan before 1919, in the Lot-et-Garonne department
 Saint-Sauveur-de-Meilhan, in the Lot-et-Garonne department